The 1975–76 Challenge Cup was the 75th staging of rugby league's oldest knockout competition, the Challenge Cup.
The final was contested by St Helens and Widnes at Wembley.

St Helens beat Widnes 20–5 at Wembley in front of a crowd of 89,982.

The winner of the Lance Todd Trophy was St Helens , Geoff Pimblett.

This was St Helens’ fifth Cup final win in eight Final appearances.

First round

Second round

Quarter-finals

Semi-finals

Final

References

External links
Challenge Cup official website 
Challenge Cup 1975/76 results at Rugby League Project
1976 Challenge Cup final at saints.org.uk

Challenge Cup
Challenge Cup